An election to the Dundee Corporation was held on 1 May 1973, alongside municipal elections across Scotland. 13 of the corporation's 36 seats were up for election.

The election saw Labour manage to hold on to its slim majority over the Progressives on the corporation, with 18 of the council's 36 seats. No seats changed hands, with the Progressives remaining on 17, and 1 Independent. Two Labour Councillors, William Millar and ex-Baillie John Stewart in Lochee and Douglas wards respectively, were deselected by Labour as candidates and ran as independents instead. Neither were re-elected.

Aggregate results

Ward results

References

1973
1973 Scottish local elections
20th century in Dundee